Ray Greer  is a game designer who has worked primarily on role-playing games.

Career
By 1982 George MacDonald and Steve Peterson opened up an office for their company Hero Games and asked player Ray Greer to join them as a partner and to handle marketing and sales. By 1986, Greer moved first to Steve Jackson Games and then to Mark Williams' special effects company. After Peterson founded the company Hero Software and gathered together a team to create a Champions computer game, Greer joined them as well, but the project was never completed. Greer was involved, with Steve Peterson and Bruce Harlick, in the Hero Games partnership with R. Talsorian Games that began in 1996. Mike Pondsmith of R. Talsorian, and Hero Games owners Peterson and Greer built conversion rules to connect up Interlock and Hero Games, resulting in the Fuzion system. The rights to Fuzion are jointly held by Pondsmith, Peterson, and Greer.

References

External links
 

Living people
Role-playing game designers
Year of birth missing (living people)